The Supreme Court of the United States handed down ten per curiam opinions during its 2010 term, which began October 4, 2010 and concluded October 1, 2011.

Because per curiam decisions are issued from the Court as an institution, these opinions all lack the attribution of authorship or joining votes to specific justices. All justices on the Court at the time the decision was handed down are assumed to have participated and concurred unless otherwise noted.

Court membership

Chief Justice: John Roberts

Associate Justices: Antonin Scalia, Anthony Kennedy, Clarence Thomas, Ruth Bader Ginsburg, Stephen Breyer, Samuel Alito, Sonia Sotomayor, Elena Kagan

Wilson v. Corcoran

Madison County v. Oneida Indian Nation of New York

Swarthout v. Cooke

Felkner v. Jackson

Bobby v. Mitts

United States v. Juvenile Male

Leal Garcia v. Texas

See also 
 List of United States Supreme Court cases, volume 562
 List of United States Supreme Court cases, volume 563
 List of United States Supreme Court cases, volume 564

Notes

References

 

United States Supreme Court per curiam opinions
Lists of 2010 term United States Supreme Court opinions
2010 per curiam